Baron Robert "Bob" Stouthuysen (born 10 March 1929, Diest, Belgium) is a Belgian businessman. He is the honorary president of the Vlaams Economisch Verbond and of Janssen Pharmaceutica. He lives in Turnhout which is in the Campine region of Flanders.

Education
In 1953, he earned a law degree at the Katholieke Universiteit Leuven (Leuven, Belgium). In addition he also graduated with a degree in business management from K.U.Leuven.

Career
He started his career as a researcher at the productivity research group of K.U. Leuven. In September 1957, the Janssen family invited him to work for Janssen Pharmaceutica. On 1 October 1958, he became the personnel manager of the company, and was involved in widely diverse personnel affairs. When Janssen Pharmaceutica was acquired by Johnson & Johnson in 1961, he was appointed to a management position. In 1962 he became the head of the commercial department and in 1963 he became the assistant manager under Frans Van den Bergh. 

In 1965 Stouthuysen was officially appointed director of the company. In 1971 he was appointed as a member of the board of directors and in 1987 he became the director and in 1988 president of Janssen Operations Worldwide. From November 1976 until May 1981, he was the president of the VEV. On 1 October 1991 he became the chairman of the board of directors. In 2004 he retired and was succeeded by Ajit Shetty.

See also
 Paul Janssen

Sources
 Plato
 In memoriam Dr. Paul Janssen

Flemish businesspeople
KU Leuven alumni
Janssen Pharmaceutica people
1929 births
Living people